VGM (Video Game Music) is an audio file format for multiple video game platforms, such as Master System, Game Gear, Mega Drive/Genesis, MSX, Neo Geo, IBM compatibles (Adlib/SoundBlaster), and has expanded to a variety of arcade system boards since its release.

The standard filename extension is .vgm, but files can also be Gzip compressed into .vgz files. Technically .vgz files should be named .vgm.gz, but because some operating systems' file managers cannot handle file name suffixes that themselves contain a period (e.g. Microsoft Windows), .vgz is instead used in order to launch a VGM player and not a file archiver program such as WinZip or WinRAR.

The VGM format is different from formats like NSF or SID, which contain the game's music code. Instead, the instructions sent to the sound chip are logged.

References

External links
VGM Rips specification page – Technical specifications
VGMRips – VGM archive of several systems
SMS Power! – VGM archive for the Sega Master System, Mark III, Game Gear, SG-1000, SC-3000, SF-7000, and OMV

Audio file formats
Video game music file formats